The Grand Chamberlain of France was one of the Great Officers of the Crown of France, a member of the Maison du Roi ("King's Household"), and one of the Great Offices of the Maison du Roi during the Ancien Régime. It is similar in name, but should not be confused with, the office of Grand Chamberman of France, although both positions could accurately be translated by the word chamberlain.

At its origin, the position of Grand Chamberlain entailed oversight of the king's chamber and his wardrobe, but in October 1545, the position absorbed the duties of the position of Grand Chambrier, which was suppressed by François I, and the Grand Chamberlain became responsible for signing charters and certain royal documents, assisting at the trial of peers, and recording the oaths of homage to the Crown, among other duties. 

The Grand Chamberlain also played an important role during coronation: he ceremonially admitted the clerical peers to the room of the king, and fitted the king with boots, dalmatic, and mantle for coronation. In the protocol of the reign of Louis XIV, the Grand Chamberlain was in the second rank during ambassadorial receptions, he served the king at table, and, at the ceremony of the Levée or royal awakening, he presented the king with a shirt. The position played a key role in state affairs in the sixteenth century, but became merely honorific in the seventeenth and eighteenth centuries.

The political importance of the Grand Chamberlain stemmed from his having permanent access to the King's Chamber. His symbol of office was the keys to the royal apartments, which he always carried; in token of which, he was permitted to place two gold keys in saltire behind his coat of arms.  He also was entitled to carry the banner of France. In rank, the position was between the Grand Maître de France and the Grand Écuyer. During a lit de justice, he sat at the king's feet.

In the first half of the 16th century, the position was always held by a member of the Orléans-Longueville family, then by the Duke of Guise, and finally – until the end of the monarchy – by a member of the La Tour d'Auvergne-Bouillon family.

List of Grand Chamberlains of France

 Renaud de Clermont (b. 1010, d. 1087; Served ?–1087, Reign of King Henry I of France)
 Pierre de La Broce (?–1278)
 Raoul of Clermont (1283–1302) 
 Enguerrand de Marigny (?–1315)
 Hugues III de Bouville (?–1331)
 Louis I, Duke of Bourbon (1310–1342)
 Peter I, Duke of Bourbon (1342–1356)
 Arnaud Amanieu, Lord of Albret (1381–1401) 
 James II, Count of La Marche (1397–1438)
 Louis, Count of Vendôme (1408–1427)
 Georges de la Trémoïlle (1427–1439)
 Jean Dunois, Count of Dunois and Longueville (1439–1468)
 Jean V de Bueil (1469–1474)
 Pierre de Guenand, seigneur de La Celle-Guenand (?–1486)
 Jean Dax, seigneur d'Axat, (1487–1495)
 Louis I d'Orléans, duc de Longueville (1512–1516)
 Francis, Duke of Guise (1551–1563)
 Charles of Lorraine, Duke of Mayenne (1563–1589)
 Henry I of Orléans, Duke of Longueville (1589–1595)
 Henry of Lorraine, Duke of Mayenne (1596–1621)
 Claude, Duke of Chevreuse (1621–1643)
 Louis, Duke of Joyeuse (1643–1654)
 Henry II, Duke of Guise (1655–1658)
 Godefroy-Maurice de La Tour d'Auvergne, duc de Bouillon (1658–1715)
 Emmanuel Théodose de La Tour d'Auvergne, duc de Bouillon (1715–1728)
 Charles-Godefroy La Tour d'Auvergne, duc de Bouillon (1728–1747)
 Godefroy-Charles-Henri La Tour d'Auvergne, duc de Bouillon (1747–1775)
 Henri Louis Marie de Rohan, duc de Montbazon (1775–1782)
 Godefroy-Charles-Henri La Tour d'Auvergne, duc de Bouillon (1782–1789)
 Charles-Maurice de Talleyrand-Périgord, prince de Talleyrand (1815–1830)

See also
 Great Officers of the Crown of France
 Maison du Roi
 Gentleman of the bedchamber
Alexandre Bontemps - Premier valet to Louis XIV

References
This article is based in part on the articles Grand chambellan de France and Liste des grands chambellans de France from the French Wikipedia, retrieved on September 6, 2006.

External links
Great Officers of the Crown
Officers at the Coronation

Court titles in the Ancien Régime